is a Japanese footballer currently playing as a forward for Cerezo Osaka.

Career statistics

Club

References

External links

1997 births
Living people
Japanese footballers
Association football forwards
J1 League players
J2 League players
Sanfrecce Hiroshima players
Ehime FC players
Cerezo Osaka players